Westelijk Havengebied is a neighborhood of Amsterdam, Netherlands.

Neighbourhoods of Amsterdam
Port of Amsterdam

nl:Westelijk Havengebied